Two male athletes from Bosnia and Herzegovina competed at the 1996 Summer Paralympics in Atlanta, United States.

See also
Bosnia and Herzegovina at the Paralympics
Bosnia and Herzegovina at the 1996 Summer Olympics

References 

Nations at the 1996 Summer Paralympics
1996
Summer Paralympics